Eucorymbia is a genus of flowering plants in the family Apocynaceae, first described as a genus in 1905. It contains only one known species, Eucorymbia alba, native to Borneo, Sumatra, and peninsular Malaysia.

References

Flora of Malesia
Monotypic Apocynaceae genera
Malouetieae